Oman Fisheries is an Omani-based company in the Sultanate of Oman that harvests, processes and retails fish. It was formed in 1989 and is the largest fishing company in the Sultanate. The company is publicly traded company in Oman with the Ministry of Agriculture and Fisheries having a 24 percent stake in the company. In 2022, Gulf Japan Food Fund (GJFF) invested USD 10 million into Oman Fisheries.

History
 
In 2011, the company announced that they would be increasing their fishing fleet with the addition of 16 new boats. This would put the number of operating vessels that they own at 20.

References

External links
 Oman Fisheries Website

Companies established in 1989